Section 32 may refer to:

Section 32, a company
Section 32 of the Canadian Charter of Rights and Freedoms
Section 32 of the Constitution of Australia

See also